The 2015 Diamond Head Classic was a mid-season eight-team college basketball tournament that was played on December 22, 23, and 25 at the Stan Sheriff Center in Honolulu, Hawaii. It was the seventh annual Diamond Head Classic tournament and was part of the 2015–16 NCAA Division I men's basketball season. No. 3-ranked Oklahoma defeated Harvard to win the tournament championship. Buddy Hield was named the tournament's MVP.

Bracket
* – Denotes overtime period

Source

References

Diamond Head Classic
Diamond Head Classic
Diamond Head Classic
December 2015 sports events in Oceania